Charles Bruce Greyson (born October 1946) is Professor Emeritus of Psychiatry and Neurobehavioral Sciences at the University of Virginia. He is author of After: A Doctor Explores What Near-Death Experiences Reveal about Life and Beyond (2021), co-author of Irreducible Mind (2007) and co-editor of The Handbook of Near-Death Experiences (2009). Greyson has written many journal articles, and has given media interviews, on the subject of near death experiences.

Academic appointments
Greyson is Chester F. Carlson Professor Emeritus of Psychiatry and Neurobehavioral Sciences, and the former  director of The Division of Perceptual Studies (DOPS), formerly the Division of Personality Studies, at the University of Virginia. He is also a Professor of Psychiatric Medicine in the Department of Psychiatric Medicine, Division of Outpatient Psychiatry, at the University of Virginia.

Research work
Greyson is a researcher in the field of near-death studies and has been called the father of research in near-death experiences. Greyson, along with Kenneth Ring, Michael Sabom, and others, built on the research of Raymond Moody, Russell Noyes Jr and Elisabeth Kübler-Ross. Greyson's scale to measure the aspects of near-death experiences has been widely used, being cited over 450 times as of early 2021. He also devised a 19-item scale to assess experience of kundalini, the Physio-Kundalini Scale.

Greyson wrote the overview of Near Death Experiences for the Encyclopædia Britannica and was the Editor-in-Chief of the Journal of Near-Death Studies (formerly Anabiosis) from 1982 through 2007. Greyson has been interviewed or consulted many times in the press on the subject of near-death experiences.

Selected publications

Greyson is author of After: A Doctor Explores What Near-Death Experiences Reveal about Life and Beyond (Macmillan, 2021), co-author of Irreducible Mind: Toward a Psychology for the 21st Century (Rowman and Littlefield, 2007) and co-editor of The Handbook of Near-Death Experiences: Thirty Years of Investigation (Praeger, 2009). He has written many journal articles on the subject of near-death experiences, and these include:

See also
George G. Ritchie
Satwant Pasricha
International Association for Near-Death Studies
Near-death studies
Life After Life
Pam Reynolds case
Eben Alexander (author)
Raymond Moody
Pim van Lommel

References

External links
Bruce Greyson biography at the University of Virginia
The Division of Perceptual Studies at the University of Virginia
Bruce Greyson personal website

1946 births
Living people
American psychiatrists
Parapsychologists
University of Virginia School of Medicine faculty
Near-death experience researchers